Peter Joseph Corr (23 June 1923 – 1 June 2001) was an Irish footballer. Corr played as an outside-right for, among others, Everton and Ireland. In 1949 he was a member of the Ireland team that defeated England 2–0 at Goodison Park, becoming the first non-UK team to beat England at home. He was the uncle of Jim, Sharon, Caroline and Andrea Corr who make up the Irish musical group The Corrs. His brother Gerry is their father. After a three-year-long battle with Alzheimer's disease, Corr died in a nursing home in Goosnargh in June 2001, aged 77.

Playing career

Club career
Corr, who played Gaelic football as a youth, played soccer for his hometown club Dundalk before signing for Preston N.E. in April 1947 for a fee of £2,500. However his appearances for Preston were limited by the form of Tom Finney and he only made three league appearances for Preston before joining Everton in August 1948. He made his league debut for Everton against Stoke City in September 1948. While at Everton he made 24 appearances and scored 2 goals. His teammates at the club included fellow Irish internationals Peter Farrell, Tommy Eglington and Alex Stevenson, and future Everton manager Harry Catterick. After leaving Everton, Corr went on to play for Bangor City and Wigan Athletic. During the 1952–53 season he played 34 games and scored 11 goals for Wigan in the Lancashire Combination. He was instrumental in Wigan winning the Combination and three cups during that season.

Irish international
While playing for Everton, Corr was capped four times for Ireland. He made his debut for Ireland on 22 May 1949 in a 1–0 win against Portugal at Dalymount Park. The following month on 12 June 1949 he also played in the 4–1 defeat to Spain, again at Dalymount Park. His third game for Ireland was as a member of the Ireland team that defeated England 2–0 at Goodison Park, becoming the first non-UK team to beat England at home. His last game for Ireland, on 13 November 1949, was a qualifier for the 1950 FIFA World Cup. Ireland lost the game 3–1 to Sweden.

Later years
After retiring as a player, Corr settled in Preston where he opened a newsagent in Water Lane with fellow former Preston N.E. player Frank O'Farrell, later to become manager at Manchester United. He then opened Corr's Hardware Shop on Sharoe Green Lane with his wife, Doreen Melling, whom he had married in 1947. They had four children: two sons, Peter Jr. and Francis, and two daughters, Susan and Patricia. Peter Corr worked as a scout for Everton and in 1967 helped persuade Howard Kendall to move from Preston N.E. to Everton.

Honours

Wigan Athletic

Lancashire Combination: 1
1952–53
Lancashire Combination Cup: 1
1952–53
Lancashire Junior Cup: 1
1952–53
Makerfield Cup
1952–53

Sources
Who's Who of Everton (2004): Tony Matthews

External links
Peter Corr at Post War Football League Database
 Ireland Stats
 Obituary in Lancashire Evening Post
Wigan Athletic fansite

1923 births
2001 deaths
Association footballers from County Louth

Dundalk F.C. players
League of Ireland players
Everton F.C. players
Gaelic footballers who switched code
Ireland (FAI) international footballers
Louth Gaelic footballers
People from Dundalk
People from Goosnargh
Preston North End F.C. players
Republic of Ireland association footballers
The Corrs
Wigan Athletic F.C. players
Deaths from Alzheimer's disease
Association football outside forwards
Bangor City F.C. players
Deaths from dementia in England